Marq may refer to:

People 
Marq Mellor (b. 1968), American field hockey player
Marq Porciuncula (b. 1987), German musician
Marq Torien (b. 1962), American singer
Marq de Villiers, Canadian writer

Other 
 Marq (company), formerly Lucidpress, an online publishing company

See also 
Margh (disambiguation)
Maraq (disambiguation)
Mark (disambiguation)
Marque (disambiguation)